Novés is a municipality located in the province of Toledo, Castile-La Mancha, Spain. According to the 2006 census (INE), the municipality has a population of 1911 inhabitants.

In his autobiographical trilogy The Forging of a Rebel, the Spanish writer Arturo Barea sets one chapter "The Lost Village" in Novés, using it as a microcosm
of the social and political tensions building up to the outbreak of the Spanish Civil War.

Notable people
 

Francisca de los Apóstoles (born between 1539 and 1541)

References

Municipalities in the Province of Toledo